The 2017–18 season was Brechin City's first season in the Scottish Championship, having finished 4th in the 2016–17 Scottish League One, winning promotion by defeating Raith Rovers and Alloa Athletic in the Championship play-offs. Brechin became the first club in 126 years to fail to win a league match, picking up just four points from 4 draws. Their sole win during the 2017–18 season came against Highland League side Buckie Thistle in the third round of the Scottish Cup.

Brechin City also competed in the Scottish Challenge Cup, Scottish League Cup and Scottish Cup.

Results & fixtures

Scottish Championship

Scottish League Cup

Table

Matches

Scottish Challenge Cup

Scottish Cup

Squad statistics

Appearances and goals

|-
|colspan="14"|Players away from the club on loan:

|-
|colspan="14"|Players who appeared for Brechin City but left during the season:
|}

Club statistics

League table

Results Summary

Transfers

Players in

Players out

Loans in

Loans out

References

Brechin City F.C. seasons
Brechin City